Induktion, Varianz und Deren Folgen ("Induction, Variance and Their Consequences") is the compilation CD released in 1993 featuring Extended play releases for four electro-industrial acts.  Most notably, the compilation appearance of Suicide Commando led to their later signing with Off Beat.

History

Induktion, Varianz und Deren Folgen was compiled by Stefan Herwig on his own label Kugelblitz Records.  The compilation features EP's by four bands on one CD.  Each EP has its own title, and the CD cover is designed with 4 different images (one for each band) so that any one of the images can be used as the cover.  This four-EP CD format was later used by Off Beat records for their "The O Files" compilations when Stefan Herwig became A&R manager for that label, and also has inspired similar products in the electro-industrial genre such as ""Quadrophobia"" and "Vier Factor".

Track listing
Suicide Commando – Never Get Out
 Take My God Away
 Never Get Out
 The Ultimate Machine
 Never Get Out (Insecticided)
	
Genital A-Tech – Technologies
 Technology
 Beat Me
 Aus Lauter Liebe

Digital Slaughter – N-Lost
 Strain
 Narkotikum
 Apathy
 Determined
 N-Lost

Dementia Simplex – Anxiety E.P.
 Cinderchild
 Immune Deficiency (Reincarnation)
 Bugbear
 Hollow Moon

Notes

External links
 at Discogs

1993 compilation albums
Industrial compilation albums